Ngalaik Dam is a dam and reservoir on Ngalaik Creek in the Pyinmana Township of the Mandalay Region of central Burma, near the capital of Naypyidaw. It was completed between 1978 and 1987.

The dam and surrounding areas also provide recreation facilities for the public from the nearby capital of Naypyitaw. Facilities for some boating, especially rowing, exist at the dam, although the facilities are generally not well-patronised. There is a small restaurant and an eco lodge at the site which provides facilities for the public.

References

Dams in Myanmar
Buildings and structures in Mandalay Region
Dams completed in 1987